C215, is the moniker of Christian Guémy, a French street artist hailing from Paris who has been described as "France's answer to Banksy".

C215 primarily uses stencils to produce his art. His work consists mainly of close up portraits of people. C215's subjects are typically those such as beggars, homeless people, refugees, street kids and the elderly. The rationale behind this choice of subject is to draw attention to those that society has forgotten about. Cats are another frequent subject of his work. C215 is a prolific street artist and has practiced his art in cities all over the world. His stencils may be seen in Barcelona, Amsterdam, London, Rome, Paris, Oslo, Colombo and different cities of Morocco.

In October 2014, C215 visited Valletta, Malta because of his interest in Caravaggio as well as 17th-century religious architecture. He produced various examples of street art on post boxes within the city, but MaltaPost removed the artworks after a few days. Various people have criticized MaltaPost for removing the artworks, including the mayor of Valletta Alexei Dingli.

In addition to his street work, C215 also produces commercial artwork for galleries on wood and canvas. C215 has to date done a number of solo gallery shows to promote his work. C215's most recent show is entitled 'Community Service', currently running in Paris.

Guémy's daughter Nina is a popular subject of his stencil art. She has also become a stencil artist in her own right.

Gallery

Further reading
C215,Pyramyd Editions, 
C215, Critères Editions, 2010, 
Community Service, Critères Editions, 2011, 
Stencil History X, Editions C215, 2007, 
C215 Un THAIIS DAMASCENNAH, Castelvecchi Editore, 2013 (IT, EN),

References

External links 

 C215 official Flickr account
 Images from C215's gallery show 'Community Service' in Paris
 C215's street pieces on Street Art London
 street art boosts economy - Christian Guémy (C215) interview 
 Interview with C215 on YouTube
 Interview with C215 on Urbanartcore.eu
 Images from C215's exhibition 'Stencil Bastards' at the Starkart Gallery in Zurich
 2009 Graffoto review of C215 solo show "Shoeshiners", Signal Gallery, London

French graffiti artists
Artists from Paris